NASCAR Thunder 2002 is a racing simulator video game developed by EA Tiburon and published by EA Sports that came out for the Sony PlayStation, Sony PlayStation 2, and Xbox. The theme song for the game on the six-generation systems is "Sweet Home Alabama" by Lynyrd Skynyrd. It is the fifth game in the EA Sports NASCAR series of video games, and is the first of the series to have a new title (the other games simply read "NASCAR", followed by the year). Notably, it is the first NASCAR game to feature alternate paint schemes on the cars. It featured the 2001 NASCAR Winston Cup Series Champion Jeff Gordon on its cover and 2000 NASCAR Winston Cup Series Champion Bobby Labonte on the disc.

NASCAR Thunder 2002 was the first NASCAR game released for the Xbox and the second released for the PlayStation 2. Game modes consist of Create-a-car, Quick race, Season mode, Career mode, and practice. Before every race, the player has the option to qualify for a position at the start of the race, get to know the track in practice, or 'race' other cars in Happy Hour. The game has 35 drivers from the 2001 Winston Cup season (minus Dale Earnhardt due to his death, but the game has many tributes to him including a black No. 3 screen on start-up) and several then-Busch Series and fantasy drivers that can be unlocked.

The PlayStation version was separate from the PS2 and Xbox versions, included only 36 drivers, and included an instant-replay feature, fantasy tracks, only 18 drivers per race, and all of the alternate paint schemes were removed. It also has a different intro without the #3 shown before the EA Sports logo.  A system of power-up/cheat cards and challenges, similar to Chase/Thunder plates and Lightning/Dodge Challenges in later editions, was a major game mode in this version. It also included the Daytona Beach track.

Reception

The PlayStation 2 and Xbox versions received "favorable" reviews, while the PlayStation version received "average" reviews, according to the review aggregation website Metacritic. NextGen said that the Xbox version was "Graphically, a solid game, with great reflections, sun wash, damage modeling, persistent skid marks, and more."

The game was a runner-up for the "Console Racing" award at the Academy of Interactive Arts & Sciences' 5th Annual Interactive Achievement Awards, which went to Gran Turismo 3: A-Spec.

References

External links
 

2001 video games
PlayStation (console) games
PlayStation 2 games
Xbox games
NASCAR video games
EA Sports games
Sports video games with career mode
Multiplayer and single-player video games
Video games developed in the United States
Simulation video games